The Katie Melua Collection is a compilation album by Georgian-born British singer and songwriter Katie Melua. The album is a two disc set with 17 songs, three previously unreleased, and a DVD that was filmed in Rotterdam, Netherlands.

The album includes the singles "When You Taught Me How to Dance" from the film Miss Potter, "What a Wonderful World" with a recording of Eva Cassidy, and three new songs: "Toy Collection" (written by Melua for the film Faintheart), "Two Bare Feet", and "Somewhere in the Same Hotel".

Track listing

Disc 1

Track listing

Disc 2 (A 90-minute DVD – The Arena Tour 2008, Live from Rotterdam)
 Piece By Piece
 I Do Believe In Love
 My Aphrodisiac Is You
 Crawling Up A Hill
 Mary Pickford
 Blues In The Night
 If You Were A Sailboat
 Ghost Town
 Thank You, Stars
 Perfect Circle
 What I Miss About You
 Spider's Web
 If The Lights Go Out
 Scary Films
 Spellbound
 Mockingbird Song
 The Closest Thing To Crazy
 Nine Million Bicycles
 On The Road Again
 Kozmic Blues
 I Cried For You
 Behind the Screens – a short film about the preparation and design of the tour production.

Extra download tracks
Three extra tracks have been released as downloads only, by different vendors:
 "Kozmic Blues" – iTunes
 "How Sweet It Is to Be Loved by You" – available on Tesco Digital download
 "By the Light of the Magical Moon" – free download from The Times

Chart performance

Weekly charts

End of year charts

Certifications

References

External links 
Official website

Katie Melua albums
2008 compilation albums
2008 video albums
2008 live albums
Video albums by British artists
Live video albums
Albums produced by Mike Batt